Theater & Orchester Heidelberg  is a theatre in Heidelberg, Baden-Württemberg. The Heidelberger Stückemarkt, an annual theatre festival and competition for emerging playwrights, is held at the theatre.

External links
  

Theatres in Baden-Württemberg
Buildings and structures in Heidelberg
Tourist attractions in Heidelberg
Theatre festivals in Germany